The following lists events that happened during 1942 in Australia.

Population
Australia had a population of 7,201,096 people consisting of 3,619,699 men and 3,581,397 women

Incumbents

Monarch – George VI
Governor-General – Alexander Hore-Ruthven, 1st Baron Gowrie
Prime Minister – John Curtin
Chief Justice – Sir John Latham

State Premiers
Premier of New South Wales – William McKell
Premier of Queensland – William Forgan Smith (until 16 September), then Frank Cooper
Premier of South Australia – Thomas Playford
Premier of Tasmania – Robert Cosgrove
Premier of Victoria – Albert Dunstan
Premier of Western Australia – John Willcock

State Governors
Governor of New South Wales – John Loder, 2nd Baron Wakehurst
Governor of Queensland – Sir Leslie Orme Wilson
Governor of South Australia – Sir Malcolm Barclay-Harvey
Governor of Tasmania – Sir Ernest Clark
Governor of Victoria – Sir Winston Dugan
Governor of Western Australia – none appointed

Events
15 February – Singapore falls to the Japanese, with approximately 15,000 Australian troops taken prisoner.
16 February - The Bangka Island massacre takes place.
19 February – Darwin is bombed by Japanese forces for the first time. At least 243 persons are killed.
1 March – The cruiser HMAS Perth is torpedoed by Japanese destroyers in the Battle of Sunda Strait, sinking with the loss of 350 crew and three civilians.
3 March – 88 Allied civilians and military personnel were killed and 22 aircraft were lost when Japanese Zero fighters strafed Broome.
20 March – At Terowie, South Australia, American General Douglas MacArthur makes his famous speech which included the words "I came out of Bataan and I shall return."
4 May – The Battle of the Coral Sea begins.
19 May – The prototype CAC Boomerang, an Australian designed and built fighter aircraft, takes to the air for the first time.
22 May – American soldier Eddie Leonski is arrested and charged for the "Brownout Murders" of three women.
31 May – During an attack on Sydney Harbour, a Japanese midget submarine sinks the converted Sydney ferry, HMAS Kuttabul, killing 21.
7 June – The Income Tax (War-time Arrangements) Act 1942 is enacted, transferring the power to levy personal income tax from the states to the federal government.
8 June – Japanese midget submarines shell Sydney and Newcastle.
6 July – Elements of the Australian 9th Division arrive in El Alamein. The Division subsequently takes part in the First and Second Battle of El Alamein.
21 July - Australia Fights Japan in Kokoda Trail
9 October - Australia adopts sections 2 to 6 of the Statute of Westminster 1931 effectively ending British dominion 
30 October – Construction begins on the Burma Railway, begun by 15,000 Australian prisoners-of-war captured by the Japanese after the fall of Singapore.
16 November - Japan retreats from Kokoda Trail with Australia being the Victor
26 November – A violent brawl breaks out in Brisbane between United States military personnel and Australian servicemen and civilians, in what becomes known as the "Battle of Brisbane". One Australian soldier is shot dead.
1 December – HMAS Armidale, a corvette of the Royal Australian Navy, is sunk by Japanese with the loss of 100 men.

Arts and literature

 The Pea-Pickers by Eve Langley is first published
 William Dargie wins the Archibald Prize with his portrait of James Heather Gordon VC

Sport
 12 September – Canterbury-Bankstown win the 1942 NSWRFL season, defeating St. George 11–9. Western Suburbs finish in last place, claiming the wooden spoon.
 Colonus wins the Melbourne Cup

Births
 14 January – Ian Brayshaw, cricketer and footballer
 17 January – Ita Buttrose, journalist
 24 February
 Colin Bond, racing driver
 David Williamson, playwright
 13 March – George Negus, journalist
 9 May – Brendon Hackwill (died 1995), Australian rules football player and basketball player
 13 May – Richard Butler, diplomat and Governor of Tasmania (2003–2004)
 15 May – Doug Lowe, Premier of Tasmania (1977–1981)
 21 May – John Konrads, swimmer (died 2021)
 2 June – Mike Ahern, Premier of Queensland (1987–1989)
 10 June – Les Carlyon, writer and newspaper editor (died 2019)
 18 June – 
 Nick Tate, actor
 Ian Tuxworth, Chief Minister of the Northern Territory (died 2020)
 29 June – Mike Willesee, television journalist (died 2019)
 30 June – Gerry Hand, politician
 2 July – John Farrington, long-distance runner
 7 July – Carmen Duncan, actress (died 2019)
 12 July – Billy Smith, rugby league footballer
 16 July – Margaret Court, tennis player
 23 July – Sallyanne Atkinson, Lord Mayor of Brisbane
 25 July – Bruce Woodley, musician
 28 July – John Sattler, rugby league footballer
 10 October – Susan Ryan, politician and age discrimination commissioner (died 2020)
 19 October – Bronwyn Bishop, politician
 24 October – Ian Collins, footballer and coach
 5 November – Percy Hobson, high jumper (died 2022)
 17 November – Derek Clayton, long-distance runner
 30 November – Michael Ah Matt (died 1984), basketball player
 23 December – Quentin Bryce, Governor of Queensland (2003–2008), Governor-General of Australia (2008–2014)
 20 December – Roger Woodward, pianist

Deaths

 22 February – Frank Wilmot, poet (b. 1881)
 11 March – Reginald Stoneham, composer and publisher (b. 1879)
 27 April – Julian Ashton, artist and teacher (born in the United Kingdom) (b. 1851)
 12 May – Sir Harold Crisp, 7th Chief Justice of Tasmania (b. 1874)
 22 May – Jean Beadle, suffragette and social worker (b. 1868)
 8 August – James Hume Cook, Victorian politician (born in New Zealand) (b. 1866)
 3 September – Sir Mungo William MacCallum, scholar (born in the United Kingdom) (b. 1854)

See also
 List of Australian films of the 1940s

References

 
Australia
Years of the 20th century in Australia